Max Williams may refer to:

 Max Williams (actor), Canadian film and television actor
 Max Williams (basketball) (born 1938), basketball general manager
 Max Williams (rugby union) (born 1998), Welsh rugby union player

See also
 Maxx Williams (born 1994), American football tight end